Optometry and Vision Science is a monthly peer-reviewed medical journal published by Lippincott Williams & Wilkins on behalf of the American Academy of Optometry. The journal was established in 1924 as the American Journal of Optometry. It was renamed the American Journal of Optometry and Archives of the American Academy of Optometry in 1941, then to the American Journal of Optometry and Physiological Optics in 1974, before obtaining its current title in 1989. The editor-in-chief is Michael D. Twa of the University of Alabama at Birmingham.

Abstracting and indexing 
The journal is abstracted and indexed in Index Medicus/MEDLINE/PubMed, the Science Citation Index, and Current Contents/Clinical Medicine. According to the Journal Citation Reports, the journal has a 2012 impact factor of 1.895.

Garland W. Clay Award
This award is given to the authors of the article published by the journal that has been most widely cited in the world of scientific literature in the preceding five years. Winners have included:

 Nathan Efron - 1980
 Jan E. Lovie-Kitchin - 1998
 Konrad Pesudovs - 2009 & 2011
 Max Snodderly

References

External links 
 

Ophthalmology journals
Publications established in 1924
Lippincott Williams & Wilkins academic journals
Monthly journals
English-language journals